The year 1716 in music involved some significant events.

Events 
July 1 – Domenico Zipoli joins the Society of Jesus.  Soon afterwards he is sent on a mission to Paraguay.
Georg Philipp Telemann visits Eisenach, resulting in an appointment as visiting Kapellmeister.
Antonio Stradivari – completes Le Messie violin (The Messiah Stradivarius)
Jonathan Swift conceives the idea for the Beggar's Opera.
Giuseppe Tartini hears Francesco Maria Veracini play the violin, and is inspired.

Classical music 
William Babell – The Fourth Book of the Ladys Entertainment
Johann Sebastian Bach  
Wachet, betet, seid bereit allezeit!, BWV 70a
Herz und Mund und Tat und Leben, BWV 147a
Mein Gott, wie lang, ach lange, BWV 155
Komm, du süsse Todesstunde, BWV 161
Ärgre dich, o Seele, nicht, BWV 186a
In dir ist Freude, BWV 615
 Diogenio Bigaglia – 12 Violin Sonatas, Op. 1
Louis-Nicolas Clérambault – Cantates françoises, Book 3
François Couperin  
Second livre de pièces de clavecin
L'art de toucher le clavecin
 Evaristo Felice Dall'Abaco – 12 Violin Sonatas, Op. 4
 Domenico Elmi – Oboe Concerto in A minor
 Francesco Geminiani – 12 Violin Sonatas, Op. 1
 Georgio Gentili – 12 Violin Concertos, Op. 6
 Christoph Graupner 
 Verleih dass ich aus Herzensgrund, GWV 1114/16
 Muss ich denn noch ferner leiden, GWV 1145/16
 Gott ist für uns gestorben, GWV 1152/16
 George Frideric Handel 
 Concerto Grosso in F major, HWV 315
 6 Fugues, HWV 605–610
 Johann Kuhnau – Wenn ihr fröhlich seid an euren Festen
Jean-Baptiste Loeillet – 12 Recorder Sonatas, Op. 4
Michel Montéclair – Musette (Les festes de l'été)
Giovanni Mossi – 12 Violin Sonatas, Op. 1
Alessandro Scarlatti – Ombre tacite e sole
Georg Philipp Telemann 
Concerto for 3 Trumpets, 2 Oboes, Timpani and Strings in D major
Brockes Passion, TWV 5:1
Germania mit ihrem Chor, TWV 12:1c
Kleine Kammermusik
Francesco Maria Veracini  
Six Overtures (first performed, Venice)
12 Sonate a violino o flauto solo e basso (manuscript)
Robert di Visée – Pièces de théorbe et de luth
Antonio Vivaldi  
La stravaganza, Op. 4
6 Violin Sonatas, Op. 5
12 Concerti, Op.7
Violin Concerto in C major, RV 195
Violin Concerto in D major, RV 205
Violin Concerto in D minor, RV 245
Violin Concerto in F major, RV 292
Violin Concerto in G minor, RV 319
Violin Concerto in A major, RV 340
Violin Concerto in A major, RV 343
Gloria in D major, RV 589
Juditha Triumphans, RV 644
Recorder Sonata in G major, RV 806
 Jan Dismas Zelenka  
 Deus dux fortissime, ZWV 60
 Da pacem Domine, ZWV 167
Domenico Zipoli – Sonate d'intavolatura per organo e cimbalo, Op. 1

Opera
Antonio Maria Bononcini – Sesostri re d'Egitto
Giuseppe Maria Buini – Armida abbandonata
Francesco Ciampi – Timocrate
Francesco Bartolomeo Conti – Il finto Policare
Johann Christoph Pepusch – Apollo and Daphne
Carlo Francesco Pollarolo – Ariodante
Alessandro Scarlatti – Carlo re d'Allemagna
Antonio Vivaldi 
Arsilda Regina di Ponto  
La costanza trionfante degl'amori e degl'odii, RV 706
L'incoronazione di Dario, RV 719

Publications
Johann Heinrich Buttstett – Ut, mi, sol, re, fa, la, tota musica et harmonia aeterna
François Campion – Traité d'accompagnement et de composition
Estienne Roger –  Concerti a Cinque con Violini, Oboè, Violetta, Violoncello e Basso Continuo del Signori G. Valentini, A. Vivaldi, T. Albinoni, F. M. Veracini, G. St. Martin, A. Marcello, G. Rampin, A. Predieri

Births 
February 9 – Johann Trier, composer
March 21 – Josef Seger, composer (died 1782)
April 12 – Felice Giardini, violinist and composer (died 1796)
c. 1716/17 – John Beard, tenor and actor-manager (died 1791)

Deaths 
August 3 – Sebastián Durón, composer (b. 1660)
September 25 – Johann Christoph Pez, composer (b. 1664)
October 1 – Giovanni Battista Bassani, composer, violinist and organist (born c. 1650)
November – Johann Aegidus Bach, organist and uncle of Johann Sebastian (born 1645)
December 1 – Johann Samuel Drese, composer (b. c. 1644)
December 6 – Benedictus Buns, Dutch religious composer (b. 1642)
date unknown – Carlo Giuseppe Testore, double bass maker (born c. 1665)

 
18th century in music
Music by year